Moscow is an unincorporated community in Lamar County, Alabama, United States, located southeast of Sulligent.

History
A post office operated under the name Moscow from 1826 to 1923.

Notable people
 John H. Bankhead, U.S. Senator from 1907 to 1920.
 John H. Bankhead II, United States Senator from 1931 to 1946. Son of John Bankhead.
 William B. Bankhead, member of the United States House of Representatives from 1917 to 1940. Served as the Speaker of the United States House of Representatives from 1936 to 1940.

References 

Unincorporated communities in Lamar County, Alabama
Unincorporated communities in Alabama